In the mathematical fields of set theory and proof theory, the Takeuti–Feferman–Buchholz ordinal (TFBO) is a large countable ordinal, which acts as the limit of the range of Buchholz's psi function and Feferman's theta function. It was named by David Madore, after Gaisi Takeuti, Solomon Feferman and Wilfried Buchholz. It is the proof-theoretic ordinal of several formal theories:
 , a subsystem of second-order arithmetic
 -comprehension + transfinite induction
 IDω, the system of ω-times iterated inductive definitions

Despite being one of the largest large countable ordinals and recursive ordinals, it is still vastly smaller than the proof-theoretic ordinal of ZFC.

Definition 

 Let  represent the smallest uncountable ordinal with cardinality .
 Let  represent the th epsilon number, equal to the th fixed point of 
 Let  represent Buchholz's psi function

References 

Proof_theory
Ordinal_numbers
Set_theory